St. Michael's Church, colloquially called Michel, is one of Hamburg's five Lutheran main churches (Hauptkirchen) and one of the most famous churches in the city. St. Michaelis is a landmark of the city and it is considered to be one of the finest Hanseatic Protestant baroque churches. The church was purposely built Protestant unlike many other Hamburg churches which were originally built by Roman Catholics and were converted to Protestantism during the Reformation. It is dedicated to the Archangel Michael. A large bronze statue, standing above the portal of the church shows the archangel conquering the devil.

The 132-meter high Baroque spire totally covered with copper is a prominent feature of Hamburg's skyline and has always been a landfall mark for ships sailing up the river Elbe.

History

The present church building is the third one at this site. The first one was built from 1647 to 1669. It became the church of the new town (Neustadt), which was created in 1625 inside the new city walls, and which grew steadily since. In 1687, the Michel became the fifth chapter church (Hauptkirche), as the new town (Neustadt) became a parish. That church was destroyed on March 10, 1750, by a lightning strike. The original church has been replicated and built in 9 different cities around the world.

This is the church as we know it today. 

In 1802, the astronomer Johann Benzenberg attempted to confirm Earth's rotation by dropping metal balls inside the church tower and measuring their eastward deviation from the vertical.

The composer and pianist Johannes Brahms was baptized on May 26, 1833 in this church and confirmed at the age of fifteen by Pastor von Ahlsen, who had married Brahms's parents.

The church was reconstructed twice in the 20th century: after catching fire in 1906 during construction work and after the bombings of 1944 and 1945. After the 1906 fire, the photos of Wilhelm Weimar were used to help recreate the church.  Since 1983, renovation is ongoing: first the spire and then the roof.

Architecture

Offering 2,500 seats, the Michel is the largest church in Hamburg. The church has a Latin cross plan with 44 m width, 52 m length and 27 m height.

The  clock tower is a significant feature of the city skyline and was a navigation aid for ships sailing on the river Elbe. The clock features an  observation level which allows a panoramic view of the city and harbour. The clock tower features four  clock faces and are the largest clock faces in Germany.

The church has five organs including a Marcussen organ and a large Steinmeyer organ with its 85 registers, 5 manuals and 6674 pipes. On 9 October 2008, St. Michael's received a new crypt organ, named after Felix Mendelssohn Bartholdy.

The pulpit is in the center of the building which was crafted out of marble by sculptor Otto Lessing from Dresden in 1910. It was designed to look like a rounded chalice and features a magnificent staircase. The large pulpit roof is crowned by the Angel of Annunciation.

Made from white marble, the baptismal font was crafted in Livorno in 1763 and donated by Hamburg merchants who lived there at that time. The baptismal font is reminiscent of a seashell and supported by three baptism angels.

The altar is 20 meters tall and was built from costly marble in 1910. The altar features three sections illustrating key scenes from the life of Jesus Christ. The central image portrays the Resurrection of Jesus and, below it, a relief depicts the Last Supper. Above the central image, there is a large crucifix.
Located at the very top, the altar crown takes the form of a dove as a symbol of the Holy Spirit and is surrounded by a radiant circle. To the right and left of the radiant circle, two angels are kneeling and bowing their heads.

Crypt
In the church crypt, there are 2,425 people interred, including the composers Johann Mattheson and Carl Philipp Emanuel Bach. The grave chambers were deeply excavated to hold four coffins stacked vertically. During the French occupation of Hamburg in 1813, burials were banned within the city and therefore also in the crypt.
In 2004, some of the graves were opened and documented by scientists. In the process, they found some less well-preserved coffins and several intact coffins containing skeletal remains and well-preserved garments and textile upholstery. In the 18th and 19th centuries, wealthy families in Hamburg, fraternities, government offices and those with the benefit of burial funds acquired graves here.
Well-preserved coffin carts can still be found in the crypt today. In the days when people were still buried in the crypt, the carts were used to transport the coffins.
During the Second World War, the crypt was used as a shelter. In early 2000, the crypt was renovated and is now used for church services and concerts.

Lutheran bishops

The church is the seat of one of the three bishops of the Evangelical Lutheran Church in Northern Germany.

Burials
Carl Philipp Emanuel Bach
Johann Mattheson

See also

List of churches in Hamburg
List of tallest church towers
List of largest clock faces
Hauptkirche (disambiguation)
 Baroque architecture
 The Reformation and its influence on church architecture

References

External links

Picture of the St. Michael's Church

Hamburg Michael Church
Baroque church buildings in Germany
Buildings and structures in Hamburg-Mitte
Hamburg Michael Church
Hamburg
Michael Church
Tourist attractions in Hamburg
Rebuilt churches in Germany
1647 establishments in the Holy Roman Empire
Buildings and structures in Germany destroyed during World War II
Rebuilt buildings and structures in Hamburg